María Mercedes Maciel Ortiz (born 1 December 1959) is a Mexican politician from the Labor Party. She has served as Deputy of the LVII and LX Legislatures of the Mexican Congress representing Oaxaca.

References

1959 births
Living people
Politicians from Guanajuato
Women members of the Chamber of Deputies (Mexico)
Deputies of the LXV Legislature of Mexico
Labor Party (Mexico) politicians
21st-century Mexican politicians
21st-century Mexican women politicians
National Autonomous University of Mexico alumni
Members of the Chamber of Deputies (Mexico) for Oaxaca